Fernhill School is a private Catholic school in Rutherglen, South Lanarkshire, Scotland. It is co-educational and accepts children aged 2 to 18 years old.

History
The school originated in a primary school run by the Sisters of Notre Dame since 1953, which in 1971 was announced for closure. A committee of parents was formed to keep the school open, and in August 1972 the current school opened. There were at the time four members of staff, with the committee serving as the Board of Governors, and the headmistress was Sister Gabriel, of the Sisters of St. Joseph of Cluny. At this time, the school was still only a primary school, and in 1973 it was decided to open a secondary department.

Today
Today, the total Nursery roll is around 20, the Primary roll is around 120 and the Secondary is around 110. Plans were announced in 2013 to make the secondary department co-educational. Fees for S3 - S6 are £12,600 per annum, making it the 20th-most expensive school in Scotland.

It was reported in a front-page article in The Herald on 11 June 2014 that the school had called in the administrators after suffering financial difficulties. Later that day, the school released a statement to say that funds had been secured from parents and governors to allow the school to remain open while refinancing was undertaken.

References

External links

Fernhill School's page on Parentzone

Educational institutions established in 1972
Catholic secondary schools in South Lanarkshire
Member schools of the Girls' Schools Association
Buildings and structures in Rutherglen
1972 establishments in Scotland